The Argument is a 2001 album by Fugazi.

The Argument may also refer to:

 The Argument (Grant Hart album)
 The Argument (film), a 2020 American film
 The Argument (play), a 2016 play by William Boyd
 The Argument (with annotations),  a 2017 Canadian-British short film
 The Argument, a song by GFOTY from Call Him A Doctor

See also
 Argument (disambiguation)